Dyseuaresta apicalis is a species of tephritid or fruit flies in the genus Dyseuaresta of the family Tephritidae.

Distribution
Bolivia.

References

Tephritinae
Insects described in 1928
Diptera of South America